William or Bill Parry may refer to:

Sports
William Parry Crake (1852–1921), or William Parry, Wanderers footballer
Bill Parry (footballer, born 1873) (1873–1923), Welsh international footballer
Bill Parry (footballer, born 1914) (1914–1964), English footballer for Leeds United
Bill Parry (footballer, born 1933) (1933–2009), Welsh footballer for Gillingham
Bill Parry (umpire) (1890–1955), English cricket umpire

Politicians
Bill Parry (politician) (1878–1952), from New Zealand
William John Parry (1842–1927), Welsh businessman, politician and author
William Parry (c. 1517–c. 1569), MP for Carmarthen Boroughs
William Thomas Parry (1837–1896), Welsh American politician in Wisconsin

Others
William Parry (spy) (died 1585), Welsh conspirator
William Parry (priest) (1687–1756), English priest and antiquarian
William Parry (Royal Navy officer, born 1705) (1705–1779), Commander-in-Chief of the Jamaica Station
William Parry (artist) (1743–1791), Welsh artist
William Parry (tutor) (1754–1819), Welsh Congregational minister and academy head
Sir William Parry (explorer) (1790–1855), British Arctic explorer
William Parry-Okeden (1840–1926), Australian official
William P. Murphy (1892–1987), William Parry Murphy, American physician
Bill Parry (mathematician) (1934–2006), British mathematician
William Parry (photojournalist) (born 1970), who has written on the Israeli West Bank barrier
Will Parry (His Dark Materials), a protagonist from the His Dark Materials trilogy by Philip Pullman

See also
 William Barry (disambiguation)
William Perry (disambiguation)